General MIDI (also known as GM or GM 1) is a standardized specification for electronic musical instruments that respond to MIDI messages. GM was developed by the American MIDI Manufacturers Association (MMA) and the Japan MIDI Standards Committee (JMSC) and first published in 1991. The official specification is available in English from the MMA, bound together with the MIDI 1.0 specification, and in Japanese from the Association of Musical Electronic Industry (AMEI).

GM imposes several requirements beyond the more abstract MIDI 1.0 specification. While MIDI 1.0 by itself provides a communications protocol which ensures that different instruments can interoperate at a fundamental level — for example, that pressing keys on a MIDI keyboard will cause an attached MIDI sound module to play musical notes — GM goes further in two ways. First, GM requires that all compliant MIDI instruments meet a certain minimal set of features, such as being able to play at least 24 notes simultaneously (polyphony). Second, GM attaches specific interpretations to many parameters and control messages which were left unspecified in the MIDI 1.0 specification. For example, assigning one of the 128 possible MIDI Program Numbers selects an instrument.  With MIDI 1.0, the assignment could be to an arbitrary instrument; but with GM, a program number assigns a specific instrument name. This helps ensure that playback of MIDI files sounds more consistently between different devices compliant with the GM specification. However, it still leaves the actual sounds of each instrument up to the supplier to implement; one manufacturer's French horn, say, could be brighter, or more mellow, than another's.

The GM 1 specification was superseded by General MIDI 2 in 1999; however, GM 1 is still commonly used. General MIDI was widely supported by computer game developers in the 1990s.

General MIDI 1 Requirements 
To be GM 1 compatible, sound generating devices (keyboards, hardware or software synthesizers, sound cards) are required to meet the General MIDI System Level 1 performance specification:

Parameter interpretations
GM Instruments must also obey the following conventions for program and controller events:

Program change events
In MIDI, the instrument sound or "program" for each of the 16 possible MIDI channels is selected with the Program Change message, which has a Program Number parameter. The following table shows which instrument sound corresponds to each of the 128 possible GM Program Numbers. There are 128 program numbers. The numbers can be displayed as values 1 to 128, or, alternatively, as 0 to 127. The 0 to 127 numbering is usually only used internally by the synthesizer; the vast majority of MIDI devices, digital audio workstations and professional MIDI sequencers display these Program Numbers as shown in the table (1–128).

Piano
1   Acoustic Grand Piano or Piano 1
2   Bright Acoustic Piano or Piano 2
3 Electric Grand Piano or Piano 3 (usually modeled after Yamaha CP70)
4 Honky-tonk Piano
5 Electric Piano 1 (usually a  Rhodes piano)
6   Electric Piano 2 (usually an FM piano patch)
7   Harpsichord
8   Clavinet

Chromatic Percussion
9   Celesta
10   Glockenspiel
11 Music Box
12 Vibraphone
13 Marimba
14 Xylophone
15 Tubular Bells
16 Dulcimer or Santoor

Organ
17 Drawbar Organ or Organ 1
18 Percussive Organ or Organ 2
19 Rock Organ or Organ 320 Church Organ
21 Reed Organ
22 Accordion
23 Harmonica
24 Bandoneon or Tango Accordion

Guitar
25 Acoustic Guitar (nylon)
26 Acoustic Guitar (steel)
27 Electric Guitar (jazz)
28 Electric Guitar (clean, usually resembling a Fender Stratocaster ran through a Roland Jazz Chorus amp)
29 Electric Guitar (muted)
30 Electric Guitar (overdriven)
31 Electric Guitar (distortion)
32 Electric Guitar (harmonics)

Bass
33 Acoustic Bass
34 Electric Bass (finger)
35 Electric Bass (picked)
36 Electric Bass (fretless)
37 Slap Bass 1
38 Slap Bass 2
39 Synth Bass 1
40 Synth Bass 2

Strings
41 Violin
42 Viola
43 Cello
44 Contrabass
45 Tremolo Strings
46 Pizzicato Strings
47 Orchestral Harp
48 Timpani

Ensemble
49 String Ensemble 1
50 String Ensemble 2
51 Synth Strings 1
52 Synth Strings 2
53 Choir Aahs
54 Voice Oohs (or Doos)
55 Synth Voice or Synth Choir
56 Orchestra Hit

Brass
57 Trumpet
58 Trombone
59 Tuba
60 Muted Trumpet
61 French Horn
62 Brass Section
63 Synth Brass 1
64 Synth Brass 2

Reed
65 Soprano Sax
66 Alto Sax
67 Tenor Sax
68 Baritone Sax
69 Oboe
70 English Horn
71 Bassoon
72 Clarinet

Pipe
73 Piccolo
74 Flute
75 Recorder
76 Pan Flute
77 Blown bottle
78 Shakuhachi
79 Whistle
80 Ocarina

Synth Lead
81 Lead 1 (square, often chorused)
82 Lead 2 (sawtooth, often chorused)
83 Lead 3 (triangle, or calliope, usually resembling a woodwind)
84 Lead 4 (sine, or chiff)
85 Lead 5 (charang, a guitar-like lead)
86 Lead 6 (voice)
87 Lead 7 (fifths)
88 Lead 8 (bass and lead or solo lead)

Synth Pad
89 Pad 1 (new age, pad stacked with a bell, often derived from "Fantasia" patch from Roland D-50)
90 Pad 2 (warm, a mellower saw pad)
91 Pad 3 (polysynth or poly, a saw-like percussive pad resembling an early 1980s polyphonic synthesizer)
92 Pad 4 (choir, similar to "synth voice")
93 Pad 5 (bowed glass or bowed, a sound resembling a glass harmonica)
94 Pad 6 (metallic, often created from a grand piano sample played with the attack removed)
95 Pad 7 (halo, choir-like pad)
96 Pad 8 (sweep, pad with a pronounced "wah" filter effect)

Synth Effects
97 FX 1 (rain, a bright pluck with echoing pulses)
98 FX 2 (soundtrack, a bright perfect fifth pad)
99 FX 3 (crystal, a synthesized bell sound)
100 FX 4 (atmosphere, usually a nylon-like sound)
101 FX 5 (brightness, a stacked pad with strong attack and rapid decay)
102 FX 6 (goblins, a slow-attack pad with chirping or murmuring sounds)
103 FX 7 (echoes or echo drops, similar to "rain")
104 FX 8 (sci-fi or star theme, usually an electric guitar-like pad)

Ethnic
105 Sitar
106 Banjo
107 Shamisen
108 Koto
109 Kalimba
110 Bag pipe
111 Fiddle
112 Shanai

Percussive
113 Tinkle Bell
114 Agogô or cowbell
115 Steel Drums
116 Woodblock
117 Taiko Drum
118 Melodic Tom or 808 Toms
119 Synth Drum
120 Reverse Cymbal

Sound Effects
121 Guitar Fret Noise
122 Breath Noise
123 Seashore
124 Bird Tweet
125 Telephone Ring
126 Helicopter
127 Applause
128 Gunshot

Percussion

In GM standard MIDI files, channel 10/17 is reserved for percussion instruments only. Notes recorded on channel 10/17 always produce percussion sounds when transmitted to a keyboard or synth module which uses the GM standard. Each distinct note number specifies a unique percussive instrument, rather than the sound's pitch.

If a MIDI file is programmed to the General MIDI protocol, then the results are predictable, but timbre and sound fidelity may vary depending on the quality of the GM synthesizer. The General MIDI standard includes 47 percussive sounds, using note numbers 35-81 (of the possible 132 numbers from 0–131), as follows:

25 Snare Roll
26 Finger Snap
27 High Q
28 Slap
29 Scratch Pull
30 Scratch Push
31 Sticks
32 Square Click
33 Metronome Bell
34 Metronome Click
35 Acoustic Bass Drum
36 Electric Bass Drum
37 Side Stick
38 Acoustic Snare
39 Hand Clap
40 Electric Snare
41 Low Floor Tom
42 Closed Hi-hat
43 High Floor Tom
44 Pedal Hi-hat
45 Low Tom
46 Open Hi-hat
47 Low-Mid Tom 
48 High-Mid Tom 
49 Crash Cymbal 1
50 High Tom
51 Ride Cymbal 1
52 Chinese Cymbal
53 Ride Bell
54 Tambourine
55 Splash Cymbal
56 Cowbell
57 Crash Cymbal 2
58 Vibraslap
59 Ride Cymbal 2
60 High Bongo
61 Low Bongo
62 Mute High Conga
63 Open High Conga
64 Low Conga
65 High Timbale
66 Low Timbale
67 High Agogô
68 Low Agogô
69 Cabasa
70 Maracas
71 Short Whistle
72 Long Whistle
73 Short Guiro
74 Long Guiro
75 Claves
76 High Woodblock
77 Low Woodblock
78 Mute Cuica
79 Open Cuica
80 Mute Triangle
81 Open Triangle
82 Shaker
83 Jingle Bell
84 Belltree
85 Castanets
86 Mute Surdo
87 Open Surdo

Controller events
In MIDI, adjustable parameters for each of the 16 possible MIDI channels may be set with the Control Change (CC) message, which has a Control Number parameter and a Control Value parameter (expressed in a range from 0 to 127). GM also specifies which operations should be performed by multiple Control Numbers.

RPN

GM defines several Registered Parameters, which act like Controllers but are addressed in a different way. In MIDI, every Registered Parameter is assigned a Registered Parameter Number or RPN. Registered Parameters are usually called RPNs for short.

Setting Registered Parameters requires sending (numbers are decimal):
two Control Change messages using Control Numbers 101 and 100 to select the parameter, followed by
any number of Data Entry messages of one or two bytes (MSB = Controller #6, LSB = Controller #38), and finally
an "End of RPN" message

The following global Registered Parameter Numbers (RPNs) are standardised (the parameter is specified by RPN LSB/MSB pair and the value is set by Data Entry LSB/MSB pair):

0,0 Pitch bend range
1,0 Channel Fine tuning
2,0 Channel Coarse tuning

An example of an RPN control sequence to set coarse tuning to A440 (parm 2, value 64) is 
101:0, 100:2, 6:64, 101:127, 100:127.

System Exclusive messages
Two GM System Exclusive ("SysEx") messages are defined: one to enable and disable General MIDI compatibility mode (for synthesizers that also have non-GM modes); and the other to set the synthesizer's master volume.

GS extensions

Roland GS is a superset of the General MIDI standard that added several proprietary extensions. The most notable addition was the ability to address multiple banks of programs (instrument sounds) by using an additional pair of Bank Select controllers to specify up to 16384 "variation" sounds (cc#0 is Bank Select MSB, and cc#32 is Bank Select LSB). Other most notable features were 9 Drum kits with 14 additional drum sounds each, simultaneous Percussion Kits - up to 2 (Channels 10/11), Control Change messages for controlling the send level of sound effect blocks (cc#91-94), entering additional parameters (cc#98-101), portamento, sostenuto, soft pedal (cc#65-67), and model-specific SysEx messages for setting various parameters of the synth engine. The 14 additional drum sounds are numbered 27-34 and 82–87, bracketing the 47 General MIDI standard sounds numbered 35–81, and are as follows:

27 High Q or'' Filter Snap
28 Slap Noise
29 Scratch Push
30 Scratch Pull
31 Drum sticks
32 Square Click
33 Metronome Click
34 Metronome Bell
82 Shaker
83 Jingle Bell
84 Belltree
85 Castanets
86 Mute Surdo
87 Open Surdo

GS was introduced in 1991 with the Roland Sound Canvas line, which was also Roland's first General MIDI synth module.

XG extensions

Yamaha XG is a superset of the General MIDI standard that added several proprietary extensions. The most notable additions were the 600 instruments and 32 notes polyphony.

XG was introduced in 1994 with the Yamaha MU-series line of sound modules and PSR line of digital keyboards.

General MIDI Level 2

In 1999, the official GM standard was updated to include more controllers, patches, RPNs and SysEx messages, in an attempt to reconcile the conflicting and proprietary Roland GS and Yamaha XG additions. Here's a quick overview of the GM2 changes in comparison to GM/GS:

 Number of Notes – minimum 32 simultaneous notes
 Simultaneous Percussion Kits – up to 2 (Channels 10/11)
 Up to 16384 variation banks are allowed, each containing a version of the 128 Melodic Sounds (the exact use of these banks is up to the individual manufacturer.)
 9 GS Drum kits are included
 Additional Control Change introduced, called "Sound Controllers 1–10":

 Registered Parameter Numbers (RPNs)
Modulation Depth Range (Vibrato Depth Range)
Universal SysEx messages
 Master Volume, Fine Tuning, Coarse Tuning
Reverb Type, Time
Chorus Type, Mod Rate, Mod Depth, Feedback, Send to Reverb
 Controller Destination Setting
 Scale/Octave Tuning Adjust
 Key-Based Instrument Controllers
 GM2 System On SysEx message

Additional melodic instruments can be accessed by setting CC#0 to 121 and then using CC#32 to select the bank before a Program Change.

See also
 Comparison of MIDI standards

References

Official MIDI Standards Organizations
MIDI Manufacturers Association (MMA) - Source for English-language MIDI specs
Association of Musical Electronics Industry  (AMEI) -Source for Japanese-language MIDI specs

External links

Music notation file formats
MIDI standards
Computer-related introductions in 1991
Japanese inventions